Jaya Pita Jaya is a 2010 Sri Lankan Sinhala action thriller film directed by Sunil Soma Peiris. It stars Amisha Kavindi and Arjuna Kamalanath in lead roles along with Rex Kodippili and Cletus Mendis. Music composed by Keshan Perera. It is the 1165th Sri Lankan film in the Sinhala cinema.

Cast
 Arjuna Kamalanath as Vijay
 Amisha Kavindi as Rekha
 Cletus Mendis as Douglas
 Rex Kodippili as IP Saliya
 Chathura Perera as PC LM
 Janesh Silva as Sergeant Freddie
 Susantha Chandramali as Sandhya
 Susila Kottage as Vijay's granny
 Gunawardana Hettiarachchi
 Jeevan Handunneththi
 Kapila Sigera

References

2010 films
2010s Sinhala-language films